The Haines-Fairbanks Pipeline was a 626-mile 8"pipeline transporting petroleum products such as Jet fuel, mogas, diesel, and avgas from Haines, Alaska through the Yukon Territory, Canada and on into Fairbanks, Alaska terminating at Fort Wainwright . The only previous pipeline in the area was the Canol pipeline built during World War II.

External links
 Haines Sheldon Museum | Preserving our past for the future
 Report

References

Oil pipelines in Alaska
Refined oil product pipelines in the United States